KS Rudnianka is a professional Polish football club based in Rudna Wielka, Poland.
The club was founded in 1952. The team's official colors are green and white

References

Football clubs in Poland
Association football clubs established in 1952
1952 establishments in Poland
Football clubs in Podkarpackie Voivodeship
Rzeszów County